Live with Kelly was the title of a long-running American syndicated morning talk show that aired from 2011–12 and 2016–17. Kelly Ripa was the host in that period.

First era (2011–12)

November 2011

December 2011

January 2012

February 2012

March 2012

April 2012

May 2012

June 2012

July 2012

August 2012

September 2012

Second era (2016–17)

May 2016

June 2016

July 2016

August 2016

September 2016

October 2016

November 2016

December 2016

January 2017

February 2017

March 2017

April 2017

References

Lists of American non-fiction television series episodes